Scott MacAlister is a Scottish songwriter. His credits include the hits "Don't Let Go" and "Best of Order" by David Sneddon, both songs feature on Sneddon's album, Seven Years – Ten Weeks.

Scottish Singles Chart

Scottish Albums Chart

UK Singles Chart

Digital Songs Released

UK Albums Chart

UK Compilation Chart

References

Scottish male songwriters
Living people
Year of birth missing (living people)